This is a list of the wettest tropical cyclones, listing all tropical cyclones known to have dropped at least  of precipitation on a single location. Data is most complete for Australia, Cuba, Dominican Republic, Japan, Hong Kong, Mexico, Yap, Chuuk, and the United States, with fragmentary data available for other countries. The French region of Réunion holds several world records for tropical cyclone and worldwide rainfall due to rough topography of the island and its proximity to the Indian Ocean.

Overall wettest

See also

 Extratropical cyclone
 List of the most intense tropical cyclones
 List of tropical cyclone records
 List of wettest tropical cyclones by country
 List of wettest tropical cyclones in the United States
 Tropical cyclone rainfall climatology
 Tropical cyclone rainfall forecasting
 Tropical cyclogenesis
 Wettest known locations

Notes

References

Tropical cyclone meteorology
Wettest
Tropical cyclones wettest